Killian Camélé (born 16 March 2003) is a French professional footballer who plays as a leftback  for Sochaux II.

Professional career
Camélé made his professional debut with Sochaux in a 0-0 Ligue 2 tie with Pau FC on 15 December 2020.

International career
Camélé is a youth international for France, having represented the France U16.

References

External links
 
 FFF Profile

2003 births
People from Saint-Louis, Réunion
Footballers from Réunion
French sportspeople of Malagasy descent
Black French sportspeople
Living people
French footballers
France youth international footballers
Association football defenders
FC Sochaux-Montbéliard players
Ligue 2 players
Championnat National 3 players